Recke is a municipality in the district of Steinfurt, in North Rhine-Westphalia, Germany.

Geography
Recke is situated approximately 20 km north-east of Rheine and 25 km north-west of Osnabrück.

Neighbouring municipalities
 Ibbenbüren
 Hopsten
 Mettingen
 Voltlage
 Neuenkirchen

Sons and daughters of Recke 
 Hans-Jürgen Klein (born 1952), politician (Alliance 90 / The Greens), member of the Lower Saxony Landtag
 Erich Rutemöller (born 1945 in Recke-Steinbeck), football coach

People who are connected to the place 

 Simon Rolfes (born 1982), German national football player, grew up in Recke

Twin town
  Ommen (Overijssel, Netherlands)

References

External links
 Official site 

Steinfurt (district)